Nicky Diles is a Grand Prix motorcycle racer from Australia.

Career statistics

By season

Races by year
(key)

References

External links
 Profile on motogp.com

1992 births
Australian motorcycle racers
Living people
125cc World Championship riders